United24 is a global initiative to support Ukraine launched on May 5, 2022 by the Ukrainian authorities during the Russian invasion of Ukraine.

As of February 24, 2023, more than USD 288 million had been raised, according to the website.

History
On May 3, the Prime Minister of Ukraine Denys Shmyhal announced that a platform for fundraising in support of Ukraine will be launched soon:

On May 5, President of Ukraine Volodymyr Zelenskyy announced the launch of the United24 global initiative, the first component of which is an online platform to raise funds to support the state. The funds raised will be distributed in three areas: defense and demining, humanitarian and medical assistance, and reconstruction of Ukraine.

All funds are transferred to the accounts of the National Bank of Ukraine and assigned to the relevant ministries: the Ministry of Defense, the Ministry of Healthcare, and the Ministry of Infrastructure. The reports on the platform are updated daily. In July 2022, United24 announced that it had raised $166,000,000 in charitable donations since the creation of the initiative.

FC Shakhtar partnered with United24 for "Pitch in for Ukraine" initiative in August 2022. President Zelenskyy met with the project's ambassadors in August to discuss the creation of a new youth program for United24.

Ambassadors

See also

Marshall Plan
Nova Ukraine
Come Back Alive
Saint Javelin
People's Bayraktar

United24 Media

References

2022 establishments in Ukraine
Organizations established in 2022
Reactions to the 2022 Russian invasion of Ukraine
Charities based in Ukraine
Economic history of Ukraine
Development in Europe
Volodymyr Zelenskyy